The 2011–2012 UCI Cyclo-cross World Cup events and season-long competition took place between 16 October 2011 and 22 January 2012, sponsored by the Union Cycliste Internationale (UCI).

Events

Men's Ranking

Women's Ranking

External links
 
 Event Rankings and standings, UCI

World Cup
World Cup
UCI Cyclo-cross World Cup